The 4th constituency of Yvelines is a French legislative constituency in the Yvelines département.

Description

The 4th constituency of Yvelines is a dense urban seat covering the Parisian suburbs around a loop in the Seine river on the eastern edge of the department.

Until 2017 the seat elected conservatives at every election since its creation with the sole exception of 1969 when it elected future Prime Minister of France Michel Rocard.

Historic Representation

Election results

2022

 
 
 
 
 
 
 
|-
| colspan="8" bgcolor="#E9E9E9"|
|-

2017

 
 
 
 
 
 
 
|-
| colspan="8" bgcolor="#E9E9E9"|
|-

2012

 
 
 
 
 
 
 
 
|-
| colspan="8" bgcolor="#E9E9E9"|
|-

2007

 
 
 
 
 
 
|-
| colspan="8" bgcolor="#E9E9E9"|
|-

2002

 
 
 
 
 
|-
| colspan="8" bgcolor="#E9E9E9"|
|-

1997

 
 
 
 
 
 
 
 
 
|-
| colspan="8" bgcolor="#E9E9E9"|
|-

Sources
Official results of French elections from 2002: "Résultats électoraux officiels en France" (in French).

4